House Museum of Bulbul or Memorial Museum of Bulbul is a historic house museum of famous Azerbaijani Soviet singer Bulbul. The memorial museum was created in 1976 on the personal initiative of Heydar Aliyev and the museum had a ceremonial opening in 1982. The museum is located in Bulbul 15, Sabail, Baku.

History
The Memorial Museum of Bulbul was created in 1976 on the personal initiative of the First Secretary of the Central Committee of the Communist Party of Azerbaijan - Heydar Aliyev. In this apartment, Bulbul has lived and worked since 1937 until the last days of his life, until September 26, 1961. On July 1, 1977, his wife - Mammadova was appointed as the director of the Memorial Museum of Bulbul. On June 10, 1982, the Memorial Museum of Bulbul in Baku had a ceremonial opening.

Exposition
The museum was placed in 4 exposition rooms.
3 rooms are kept as a souvenir, one is an exhibition room.
The museum collects documents and materials about Bulbul's creative, scientific, pedagogical, social activities.
Among them there are original manuscripts, gramophone shafts, photographs, notes, books, household items, artwork and personal belongings.
Branches: House-Museum of Bulbul in Shusha.
But since 1992, after the capture of Shusha in 1992 by Armenian forces, it has stopped its activity.

Gallery

References

Museums in Baku
Museums established in 1976
Biographical museums in Azerbaijan